Veladyris is a genus of clearwing (ithomiine) butterflies, named by Fox in 1945. They are in the brush-footed butterfly family, Nymphalidae. It contains only one species, Veladyris pardalis, which is found in Ecuador and Peru.

Subspecies
V. p. pardalis (Ecuador)
V. p. aurea Lamas, 1980 (Ecuador)
V. p. christina Lamas, 1980 (Peru)
V. p. cytharista (Hewitson, 1874) (Peru)
V. p. totumbra (Kaye, 1919) (Peru)

There is one more undescribed subspecies from Peru.

References 

Ithomiini
Nymphalidae of South America
Monotypic butterfly genera
Nymphalidae genera